Sibinj is a village and municipality in Brod-Posavina County, Croatia part of Slavonski Brod built-up area. There are 6,895 inhabitants; a majority are Croats according to the 2011 census.

See also
Sibinj railway station

References

External links

 

Municipalities of Croatia
Populated places in Brod-Posavina County